Tam Tiến may refer to several places in Vietnam, including:

 Tam Tiến, Bắc Giang, a rural commune of Yên Thế District.
 , a rural commune of Núi Thành District.